Yavneh College may refer to either:

Leibler Yavneh College in Melbourne, Australia
Yavneh College, Borehamwood, England